The Manx are an ethnic group from the Isle of Man in the Irish Sea in northern Europe. They are often described as a Celtic people on the basis of their recent Goidelic Celtic language, but their ethnic origins are mixed, including Germanic (Norse and English) lines.

Actors
Samantha Barks (born 1990), actor and musician
Jamie Blackley (born 1991), actor
Amy Jackson (born 1992), actress known for work in Indian films
Joe Locke (born 2003), actor
Dursley McLinden (1965–1995) actor, dancer, and singer
Anthony Quayle (1913–1989), actor of Manx ancestry
 Evie Killip (born 1992) actor, BBC radio actor, voiceover artist

Armed forces
Robert Henry Cain (1909–1974), army major and Victoria Cross recipient
Fletcher Christian (1764–1793), naval officer and mutineer on HMS Bounty
William Garrett (1842–1916), Medal of Honor recipient in American Civil War
Peter Heywood (1772–1831), naval officer and mutineer on HMS Bounty

Artists
Rayner Hoff (1894–1937), Manx-born Australian sculptor
Bryan Kneale (born 1930), sculptor
Archibald Knox (1864–1933), designer
Paul Lewthwaite (born 1969), sculptor
Chris Killip (1946–2020), photographer and Harvard professor

Musicians
Dan Auerbach (born 1979), US musician of Manx descent
Barry Gibb (born 1946), musician: Bee Gees
Maurice Gibb (1949–2003), musician: Bee Gees
Robin Gibb (1949–2012), musician: Bee Gees
Davy Knowles (born 1987), musician: Back Door Slam
Harry Manx (born 1955), Manx-born Canadian musician

Politicians
Illiam Dhone (William Christian, 1608–1663), nationalist and politician
Robert Quayle Kermode (1812–1870), Manx-born Tasmanian politician
Dan Quayle (born 1947), Indiana Senator and Vice President of the United States, of Manx descent
Sir Miles Walker (born 1940), politician: first Chief Minister of the Isle of Man

Scholars
Martin Bridson (born 1964), mathematician
Edward Forbes (1815–1854), naturalist and botany professor
John Kelly (1750–1809), lexicographer and Bible translator into Manx
Sir Frank Kermode (1919–2010), professor of English
Randolph Quirk (Lord Quirk, 1920–2017), linguistics professor and life peer

Sports people
Jonathan Bellis (born 1988), cyclist
Mark Cavendish (born 1985), cyclist, winner of 34 Tour de France stages
Mark Christian (born 1990), cyclist
Conor Cummins (born 1986), motorbike road racer
Tara Donnelly (born 1998), gymnast
Zoe Gillings (born 1985), snowboarder
David Higgins (born 1972), rally car driver
Mark Higgins (born 1971), rally car driver
Darryl Hill (born 1996), snooker player
Peter Kennaugh (born 1989), cyclist
Tim Kennaugh (born 1991), cyclist
Dan Kneen (1987–2018), motorcycle racer
David Knight (born 1978), enduro motorcyclist
David Lyon (born 1943), cricketer
Dave Molyneux (born 1963), sidecar racer
Kieran Tierney (born 1997), Manx-born footballer, Scottish international

Writers
T. E. Brown (1830–1897), poet, scholar and theologian
Hall Caine (1853–1931), novelist and playwright
Cyril Clague (c. 1880–1946), poet and dramatist
Mona Douglas (1898–1987), poet and folklorist
Eliza S. Craven Green (1803–1866), poet
Jane Holland (born 1966), poet, performer and novelist brought up on Man
Sarah Holland (born 1961), writer, actress and singer
Josephine Kermode (pseudonym Cushag, 1852–1937), poet and playwright
Nigel Kneale (1922–2006), screenwriter
Charlotte Lamb (Sheila Holland née Coates, 1937–2000), romantic novelist
Sophia Morrison (1859–1917), folklorist
Esther Nelson (1810–1843), poet
Hilary Robinson (born 1972), children's author
Christopher R. Shimmin (1870–1933), playwright and politician
Thomas Shimmin (1800 – c. 1876–1879), poet and rag-gatherer
Brian Stowell (1936–2019), writer, broadcaster and translator into Manx language
George Waldron (1690 – c. 1730), topographer and poet

Others
George Q. Cannon (1827–1901), Mormon apostle
Richard Costain (1839–1902), founder of Costain Group
Colonel Routh Goshen (Arthur Caley, 1824–1889), giant and circus performer
Nina Hunt (1932–1995), Latin American dance coach and choreographer
Abdullah Quilliam (1856–1932), Victorian Muslim brought up on Man

See also
List of residents of the Isle of Man
Lists of people by nationality
Manx people

References

 
Manx
People